The Day the Wall Came Down are two sculptures by Veryl Goodnight honoring the spontaneous end of the Berlin Wall on November 9, 1989. It depicts five horses leaping over actual pieces of the broken wall.

There are two copies of the sculpture. 

One, sculpted in 1996, was initially installed at Stone Mountain Park near Atlanta, Georgia for the 1996 Olympic Games. It was moved in 1997 and is now exhibited on the grounds of the George H. W. Bush Presidential Library in College Station, Texas. 

The second, finished in 1998, was given as a gift from the United States to Germany, and is located at Clayallee near the Allied Museum in the former American sector of Berlin.

See also
 List of Berlin Wall segments

References

1996 sculptures
1998 sculptures
Berlin Wall
Horses in art
Statues in Texas
Statues in Germany